Acanthopsyche punctimarginalis is a moth in the Psychidae family. It is found in Sri Lanka.

References

Natural History Museum Lepidoptera generic names catalog

Psychidae
Moths described in 1897